Saint Charles North (SCN) High School is a public four-year high school, located in St. Charles, Illinois, a western suburb of Chicago, Illinois, in the United States. It is part of Community Unit School District 303 which also includes Saint Charles East High School.

History
Originally, the main campus was built in 1995 by Hestrup & Associates as Wredling Middle School with a capacity of 1300; in 1999–2000 it was expanded and converted into St. Charles' second high school at a cost of $41,600,000.

In spring 2001, a serious mold problem was discovered at St. Charles East, the district's other high school, and was determined to be the source of some student illnesses. East students received an extra two weeks of spring break while school board officials decided on the best recourse. For the rest of the 2000-2001 school year, East and North students both used the North campus, on a split schedule, East students in the morning and North students in the afternoon. After repairs, which totaled nearly $30 million, classes resumed their normal locations and schedules the following school year.

Academics
In 2006, Saint Charles North had an average composite ACT score of 22.6 and graduated 100% of its senior class. Saint Charles North has made Adequate Yearly Progress on the Prairie State Achievement Examination, a state test which is mandatory under the No Child Left Behind Act.

St. Charles North High School offers the following Advanced Placement Program courses:

Biology
Calculus AB
Calculus BC
Chemistry
Computer Science A
English Language
English Literature
Environmental Science
European History
French Language
German Language

Latin
Macroeconomics
Music Theory
Physics
Psychology
Spanish Language
AP Seminar
Spanish Literature
Statistics
Studio Art
U.S. Government
U.S. History

Currently, St. Charles North is undergoing curriculum renewal and redesign in partnership with the Illinois Math and Science Academy along with Brown University. The average class size is 22.8.

Fifty St. Charles North students were recently named AP Scholars for their exceptional performance on the AP tests administered in May 2006.

In the 2007 National Merit Scholarship Program, St. Charles North was represented by two finalists: Alison J. Conn and  Raymond H. Hsu. Hsu, the valedictorian for the Class of 2007, and Conn went on to win National Merit Scholarships. The following year, St. Charles North once again boasted two finalists (Patrick Eschenfeldt and Katharine Fragoso) and one winner (Eschenfeldt).

Athletics
Saint Charles North has 35 athletic teams, of which 18 are for boys and 17 are for girls, which compete in the DuKane Conference of the Illinois High School Association.

Boys' Sports
Baseball
Basketball
Bowling
Cross country
Diving
Football
Frisbee golf
Golf
Hockey
Lacrosse
Rugby
Soccer
Swimming
Tennis
Track and field
Volleyball
Water polo
Wrestling

Girls' Sports
Badminton
Basketball
Bowling
Cheerleading
Cross country
Diving
Drill team
Golf
Gymnastics
Lacrosse
Soccer
Softball
Swimming
Tennis
Track and field
Volleyball
Water polo

In 2010, St. Charles North was awarded a Blue Ribbon, which honors schools that have achieved high levels of performance or significant improvements with emphasis on schools serving disadvantaged students.

Mock Trial

1st place at the ISBA High School Mock Trial Invitational (2014, 2017, 2018)
2nd place at the ISBA High School Mock Trial Invitational (2013, 2015, 2016)
10th place at the National High School Mock Trial Championship (2014)
3rd place at the Empire World Championship (2016)
4th place at the Empire World Championship (2017)

Notable alumni
Austin Kleba - Professional Speed skater World champion, 2022 USA Olympic team
Pat Brown - NFL offensive lineman 
Tyler Davis - Kicker for the Penn State University football team
Jeffery Austin - Singer and contestant on The Voice (U.S. TV series)

References

External links
Official website

Public high schools in Illinois
Educational institutions established in 2000
St. Charles, Illinois
Schools in Kane County, Illinois
2000 establishments in Illinois